Nathaniel Lammons and Jackson Withrow were the defending champions but only Withrow chose to defend his title, partnering Denys Molchanov. Withrow lost in the quarterfinals to Andrej Martin and Tristan-Samuel Weissborn.

Nicolás Barrientos and Miguel Ángel Reyes-Varela won the title after defeating Jelle Sels and Bart Stevens 7–5, 6–3 in the final.

Seeds

Draw

References

External links
 Main draw

Heilbronner Neckarcup - Doubles
2022 Doubles